Moradabad Nurali (also Romanized as Morādābād Nūrʿalī; also known as Morādābād) is a village in Nurabad Rural District, in the Central District of Delfan County, Lorestan Province, Iran. At the 2006 census, its population was 866, in 172 families.

References 

Towns and villages in Delfan County